Sulaymān ibn ‘Abd al-Wahhāb at-Tamīmī was an Islamic scholar, Hanbali jurist, and theologian from the Najd region in central Arabia. He was the old brother of Muhammad ibn Abd al-Wahhab, the founder of the Wahhabi movement, and he was one of the first critics of his brother and the Wahhabi movement. He considered the Wahhabi doctrine a heresy and it is likely that he was the first to use the word "Wahhabi" to refer to his brother's doctrine in his treatise The Unmistakable Judgment in the Refutation of Muhammad ibn 'Abd al-Wahhab.

The dispute between them reached the point of confrontation with weapons and fighting, and the Wahhabi historian Hussein ibn Ghannam documented that bloody conflict between the two brothers in his book, which was printed by Abdel Mohsen Aba Bateen in Egypt in 1368 AH. Abdullah bin Abdul Rahman bin Saleh Al Bassam mentions him in his book "Scholars of Najd during eight centuries" in which he says “Sheikh Suleiman is in breach of his brother Sheikh Muhammad and his call and is hostile to it and a response to it.

Early life
Sulayman was born in the town of 'Uyayna when his father was a judge there. He learned under the tutelage of his father and others, proceeding to complete his legal education in Huraymila at the hands of his father and other scholars of his time, especially in Fiqh. Sulayman succeeded his father in the Huraymila district, and he took his place after his death in 1153 AH. Sulayman bin Abd al-Wahhab was older than his brother Muhammad, who studied with him as he studied with his father Abd al-Wahhab. Sulayman bin Abd al-Wahhab, was described by his contemporaries as a reliable reference for scholars, and a reliable reference for the general public, and was known for his knowledge, reason, piety and sincerity. The historian Ibn Bishr described him in his history as one of the scholars, judges, and jurists of knowledge.

Major works and opposition to Wahhabism
Eight years after the start of the Wahhabi movement, Sulayman sent a detailed letter addressed to Hassan bin Idan, which later was dubbed by publishers as "Separating the speech in response to Muhammad bin Abdul-Wahhab" This book was mentioned in the book “The Weak clouds on the Hanbali strips” by the scholar Muhammad bin Abdullah bin Hamid Al-Najdi Al-Hanbali. The book is in the Al-Azhar library where they keep a manuscript copy of it under the title: “Responding to those who disbelieve Muslims due to vowing to others but God and seeking help from others and so on.” There is another copy with the same address in the Public Endowments Library in Baghdad. It appears that Suleiman bin Abd al-Wahhab did not name his book or rather he did not intend to write a book at all, as they were lengthy letters in which he responded to his brother's excesses, and that manuscript has spread without a title, so different titles were formulated according to the place and time, according to the publisher, and according to the directions.

The last of those selected titles was entitled: "Divine Thunderbolts in Response to Wahhabism.", This book or that message had a profound impact on informing people about the reality of the Wahhabi Movement and for this reason his opinion fell on the site of contentment and acceptance, as Sulayman bin Abdul Wahhab was a witness who testified about his brother Muhammad and had lived with him closely, as and witnessed events of the Sedition, and its actions and behaviours, and accused it of crimes and calamities this bloody vocation brought upon the nation and the people, so his testimony was paid attention to.

Therefore, many of the tribal chiefs, scholars of the country and the commoners refrained from following the Wahhabi Movement, and adherence to the doctrine of the Sunnis and the community, as well as the strength of opinion and the argument of Sulayman, which he presented in his letters and the sincerity of what he conveyed from the opinions and actions had a great impact in deterring the potential followers. He made them review themselves, and all the neutral researchers and followers with the exception of the Wahhabi followers admitted that Sheikh Suleiman was - like his father - one of the fiercest opponents of the Wahhabi division, before its appearance to the public and even after its spread. But after the Wahhabi Movement progressed and his brother Muhammad insisted on proceeding with his goal, Sulayman initiated his response through these letters that were collected later in a printed book, where Suleiman set out to criticize and refute that movement to sceptical Muslims explain the flaws of the movement, and to disavow its beliefs and warn against the actions of its followers and deter their actions. Many of the Najd sheikhs and their scholars responded to Muhammad ibn Abd al-Wahhab and refuted his movement.

See also 
 Ahmad Zayni Dahlan

Notes

References

Hanbalis
Atharis
18th-century Muslim theologians
Sunni Muslim scholars of Islam
Sharia judges
Critics of Wahhabism
1699 births
1793 deaths
1794 deaths